Kingsley Ogundu Chinda (born 24 March 1966) is a Nigerian politician and member of the Nigerian National Assembly. O.K Chinda is currently representing Obio/Akpor Constituency in the Federal House of Representative.

Early life and education 
Hon. Ogundu Kingsley Chinda was born in the family of the late Chief Thomson Worgu Chinda of Elelenwo Town in Obio / Akpor Local Government Area of Rivers State. He grew up under the tutelage of pseudo - parents, Chief (Barr) Mrs. E.N. Ogan and later Chief (Barr) & Mrs. C.A.W Chinda.

Kingsley Ogundu Chinda comes from the Chidamati family in the Rumuodikirike Compound, the community of Rumuodani, and the town of Elelenwo.

He attended State School 1, Orogbum, Port Harcourt, Stella Maris College, Port Harcourt, Rivers State School of Basic Studies, Rivers State University of Science and Technology, Nkpolu, Port Harcourt and Nigerian Law School, Lagos, and was duly appointed to the Nigerian Bar in 1995.

A clever lawyer and community leader, he is a leading partner in the law firm of Onyeagucha, Chinda and Associates, with offices in Port Harcourt, Owerri and Abuja. A man of grassroots contact with his people at all times, Hon. O.K. Chinda has extensive experience working in various areas of law, including Class Action, Human Rights and the Environment.

Political appointments 
Legal Adviser, Grassroots Democratic Movement (GDM)
Obalga Legal Adviser, People Democratic Party (PDP), Obalga (1999-2004)
Legal Adviser to the Local Government Council of Obio / Akpor (2005-2007) 
Hon. Environment Commissioner, River State (2008-2010)

Personal life 
He is happily married to Mrs. Beauty A. Chinda and they are blessed with three (3) children: Angel, Kaka and Iche.

References

Living people
Politicians from Port Harcourt
Peoples Democratic Party members of the House of Representatives (Nigeria)
Members of the House of Representatives (Nigeria) from Rivers State
1966 births